The Financial Services Institute of Australasia (FINSIA) is a professional institute for practitioners in the financial industry in Australia and New Zealand. FINSIA was formed in 2005 by the merger of the Australasian Institute of Banking and Finance (AIBF), founded 1886 and the Securities Institute of Australia (SIA), founded 1966.

Chris Whitehead is the Institute's CEO. FINSIA has about 8,000 members.

In 2007 the institute sold its education business to Kaplan, Inc. then part of the Washington Post.

The institute introduced the Financial Service Professional certificate in 2010.

FINSIA offers educational scholarships and support to its members.

References

External links
FINSIA website

Organisations based in Australia
Organisations based in New Zealand
Business and finance professional associations